Jesus Christ Superstar is a 1970 album musical by Andrew Lloyd Webber and Tim Rice, on which the 1971 rock opera of the same name was based. Initially unable to get backing for a stage production, the composers released it as an album, the success of which led to stage productions. The album musical is a musical dramatisation of the last week of the life of Jesus Christ, beginning with his entry into Jerusalem and ending with the Crucifixion. It was originally banned by the BBC on grounds of being "sacrilegious". By 1983, the album had sold over seven million copies worldwide.

Composition
The album's story is based in large part on the Synoptic Gospels and Fulton J. Sheen's Life of Christ, which compares and calibrates all four Gospels. However, greater emphasis is placed on the interpersonal relationships of the major characters, in particular, Jesus, Judas and Mary Magdalene, relationships that are not described in depth in the Gospels.

Lyricist Rice said he took inspiration from the Bob Dylan song "With God on Our Side".

"Herod's Song" is a lyrical rewrite of "Try It and See", previously written by Lloyd Webber and Rice as a proposed British entry into the 1969 Eurovision Song Contest to be sung by Lulu, then recorded and released as a single by Rita Pavone. The writers had also included it (as "Those Saladin Days") in an aborted show called Come Back Richard Your Country Needs You.

The melody of "I Don't Know How to Love Him" also predates Jesus Christ Superstar; it was rewritten from a 1968 Lloyd Webber/Rice collaboration titled "Kansas Morning".

Recording
For the recording, Lloyd Webber and Rice drew personnel from both musical theatre (Murray Head had just left the West End production of Hair) and the British rock scene (Ian Gillan had only recently become the singer of Deep Purple). Many of the primary musicians—guitarists Neil Hubbard and Henry McCullough, bassist Alan Spenner, and drummer Bruce Rowland—came from Joe Cocker's backing group The Grease Band. Saxophonist Chris Mercer had also played with Hubbard in Juicy Lucy.

Release
The first piece of Superstar released was the title song, as a single in November 1969 backed with the instrumental "John Nineteen Forty-One" (see ). The full album followed almost a year later.

The album topped the U.S. Billboard Top LP's chart in both February and May 1971 and ranked number one in the year-end chart ahead of Carole King's massive hit Tapestry. It also served as a launching pad for numerous stage productions on Broadway and in the West End. The original 1970 boxed-set issue of this two-record set was packaged in the U.S. with a special thin brown cardboard outer box ("The Brown Album") which contained the two vinyl records and a 28-page libretto.

Track listing
All compositions written by Tim Rice (lyrics and book) and Andrew Lloyd Webber (music).

Credits
Main players
 Ian Gillan – Jesus Christ
 Murray Head – Judas Iscariot
 Yvonne Elliman – Mary Magdalene
 Victor Brox – Caiaphas, High Priest
 Barry Dennen – Pontius Pilate

Supporting players
 Brian Keith – Annas
 John Gustafson – Simon Zealotes
 Paul Davis – Peter
 Mike d'Abo – King Herod

Other players
 Annette Brox – Maid by the Fire
 Paul Raven – Priest
 P. P. Arnold, Tony Ashton, Tim Rice, Peter Barnfeather, Madeline Bell, Brian Bennett, Lesley Duncan, Kay Garner, Barbara Kay, Neil Lancaster, Alan M. O'Duffy, Terry Saunders – Background vocals
 Choir conducted by Geoffrey Mitchell
 Children's choir conducted by Alan Doggett on "Overture"
 The Trinidad Singers, under the leadership of Horace James, on "Superstar"

Musicians
 Neil Hubbard – electric guitar
 Henry McCullough – electric guitar, acoustic guitar
 Alan Spenner – bass guitar
 Chris Mercer – tenor sax
 J. Peter Robinson – piano, electric piano, organ, positive organ
 Bruce Rowland – drums, percussion

Other musicians
 Norman Cave, Karl Jenkins – piano
 Mick Weaver – piano, organ
 Andrew Lloyd Webber – piano, organ, Moog synthesizer
 Mike Vickers – Moog synthesizer
 Alan Doggett – principal Conductor, Moog synthesizer
 Strings of the City of London Ensemble
 Clive Hicks, Chris Spedding, Louis Stewart, Steve Vaughan – guitar
 Jeff Clyne, Peter Morgan, Alan Weighall – bass guitar
 Harold Beckett, Les Condon, Ian Hamer, Kenny Wheeler – trumpet
 Anthony Brooke, Joseph Castaldini – bassoon
 Andrew McGavin, Douglas Moore, James Brown, Jim Buck Sr., Jim Buck Jr., John Burdon – horns
 Keith Christie, Frank Jones, Anthony Moore – trombone
 Ian Herbert – clarinet
 Chris Taylor, Brian Warren – flute
 Bill LeSage, John Marshall – drums

Production
 Alan O'Duffy – chief engineer

Reissue
Original Concept Recording. Jesus Christ Superstar – A Rock Opera. Universal City, California: MCA Records Inc. [USA], ©1993 (released 24 SEP 1996). Cat. No. MCAD2-11542 [2 CDs], UPC 008811154226
(N.B.: Black title on front and back cover; gold 'angels' logo; gold lettering on the spine. Depending on the retailer, an outer sticker may state that the album was 'Digitally Remastered [Complete on 2 CDs]' and/or 'Original Artwork and Libretto'. This information is not found on the inner packaging.)

Charts

Weekly charts

Year-end charts

Certifications and sales

See also
 Jesus Christ Superstar
 Jesus Christ Superstar (film)

References

External links
 jesuschristsuperstar.com: The Album
 

1970 albums
Albums produced by Andrew Lloyd Webber
Albums produced by Tim Rice
Andrew Lloyd Webber albums
Caiaphas
Concept albums
Cultural depictions of Pontius Pilate
Decca Records albums
Jesus Christ Superstar
MCA Records albums
Rock operas
Tim Rice albums